Myopsyche langi is a moth of the subfamily Arctiinae. It was described by William Jacob Holland in 1920. It is found in the Democratic Republic of the Congo.

References

 

Arctiinae
Moths described in 1920